Oedera imbricata is a prickly shrublet belonging to the family Asteraceae.

It is indigenous to the southern Cape region of South Africa, where it occurs in Fynbos and Renosterveld vegetation, from the West Coast, eastwards as far as Grahamstown.

Description
Oedera imbricata is a small (50 cm high), sprawling shrublet. The leaves are small (15 x 5 mm), hard and stiff, with a prominent midrib. They grow densely packed along the stems.

The yellow flowerheads appear in Spring. They are 40mm wide, consist of more than one individual flowerheads (a diagnostic character), of which the outer ones have visible ray-florets.

Related species
It resembles Oedera capensis, which however has longer, spreading, marginally-toothed leaves.

References

Endemic flora of South Africa
imbricata
Renosterveld